Trichura cerberus is a moth in the subfamily Arctiinae. It was described by Peter Simon Pallas in 1772. It is found in Trinidad and the Brazilian states of São Paulo and Rio de Janeiro.

References

Moths described in 1772
Arctiini
Taxa named by Peter Simon Pallas